A stooge or stooges may refer to:

 Straight man (stock character), a comedian who feeds lines to another
 Shill, a confederate or performer who acts as if they're a spectator
 The Stooge, a 1952 American film
 The Three Stooges, a comedy group from the 1930s to the 1970s
 The Three Stooges (2012 film), a film based on the comedy team
 The Stooges, a late 1960s and early 1970s rock band
 The Stooges (album), their debut album
 Fuj The Stooge, nickname of 1980s wrestling manager Mr. Fuji given to him by his former proteges Demolition 
 Stooges Brass Band, a New Orleans brass band
 Stooge sort, a recursive sorting algorithm in computer software